Småstjärnorna was a Swedish talent show with child participants. It aired on TV4 between 16 June 1995 and 16 August 2003. The children performed songs by their favourite artists while dressing up as and impersonating them on stage. In 1997, an eight year old Alicia Vikander appeared on the show and performed as Helen Sjöholm.

References

TV4 (Sweden) original programming